Deepak Kumar was a professor of History of Science and Education, at Jawaharlal Nehru University, New Delhi, India. Kumar lectured at numerous universities within India and abroad, held visiting fellowships at the universities of Cambridge, London, Leiden, The Smithsonian Institution, etc. and has also taught at Wisconsin University, Madison, USA, and York University in Toronto, Canada.

Kumar argues that British colonial rule in India played a major role in how European scientific fields developed. One of his major works is Science and the Raj: A study of British India is in the field of history of science in India.

A 2017 work is The Trishanku Nation reviewed in Sage Publications 

In describing medical encounters in colonial India, Kumar argues that Western medical discourse occupied an important place in the process of colonization and it worked towards a scientific hegemony. "Indigenous systems were so marginalised that their practitioners often sought survival in resistance rather than collaboration." 

A number of his publications are cataloged at WorldCat: These include, as of August 2021, publications in English (983), German (6), Arabic (2), and Hindi (2).

Books
 Kumar, Deepak (ed.), Science and Empire: Essays in Indian Context, 1700-1947. Delhi: Anamika Prakashan, 1991
 Kumar, Deepak (ed.), Disease and Medicine in India: A Historical Overview, Tulika, 2001 
 Kumar, Deepak, Science and the Raj: A Study of British India, Oxford University Press, 2006 (2nd edition) 
 Kumar, Deepak & Roy MacLeod (eds.), Technology and the Raj, SAGE, New Delhi, 1995 (Enlarged Hindi version was published by Granthshilpi, Delhi in 2002, 2nd edition with a new Preface, published by Aakar Books, Delhi, 2022)
 Kumar, Deepak, Vinita Damodaran, Rohan D'Souza (eds.), The British Empire and the Natural World: Environmental Encounters in South Asia, OUP, Delhi, 2010.
https://www.jstor.org/stable/4405022

 Kumar, Deepak & Chaube, Devendra (eds.), Hashiye ka Vritanta (Narrative of the Margins), in Hindi, Aadhar Publications, Panchkula, 2011.
 Kumar, Deepak and Rajsekhar Basu (eds.) Medical Encounter in British India, OUP, Delhi, 2013. 
 Kumar, Deepak, J.Bara, N.Khadria and R. Gayathri (eds.), Education in Colonial India: Historical Insights, Manohar Books, Delhi, 2013.
 Kumar, Deepak, The Trishanku Nation: Memory, Self, and Society in Contemporary India, OUP, Delhi, 2016.
 Kumar, Deepak and Raha, Bipasha (eds.), Tilling the Land: Agricultural Knowledge and Practices in Colonial India, Primus, Delhi, 2016.
Kumar, Deepak and Rajsekhar Basu (eds.) Medical Encounter in British India, OUP, Delhi, 2013.
Kumar, Deepak, Trishanku Rashtra, (in Hindi), Rajkamal Prakashan, Delhi, 2018.
Kumar, Deepak, Aatam Khabar: Sanskriti, Samaj aur Hum, (in Hindi), Aakar Books, Delhi, 2022.
Kumar, Deepak, 'Culture' of Science and the Making of India, Primus, Delhi, 2022

References

Sources
Sardar, Ziauddin and Loon, Borin Van 2001. Introducing Science. US: Totem Books (UK: Icon Books).

Positions

Lecturer, Department of History, Kurukshetra University, 1976-1983.
Scientist, History and Philosophy of Science Division, NISTADS, 1983-1997.
Associate Professor, Zakir Husain Centre for Educational Studies, JNU, 1998-1999
Professor, Zakir Husain Centre for Educational Studies, JNU, 2000 to date.

Awards & Honours
President and Convenor, 20th International Association of Historians of Asia Conference, held at JNU, New Delhi, on 14–17 November 2008.
President, International Commission on Science & Empire, IUHPS/DHS, 1997-2001.
President of the Modern India Section, Indian History Congress, 60th Session, Calicut, December 1999.
Professor R.C.Gupta Endowment History of Science Lecture Award given by the National Academy of Science, Allahabad, July 2001.
President, South Asia Section, Indian Association of Asian and Pacific Studies, Second Biennial Conference, Sambalpur University, 29–31 January 2004.
Vice-President, International Association of Historians of Asia, 2004–06, elected at the 18th IAHA Conf. held at Taipei in 2004.
Member, Academie Internationale D’Histoire des Sciences, Paris.
Vice-President, Association of South Asian Environmental Historians, 2007- 2009, reelected 2010.

Selected Peer Reviewed Publications

The Trishanku Nation: Memory, Self and Society in Contemporary India, OUP, Delhi, 2016.

Science and the Raj, Enlarged Second Edition by OUP, Delhi, in Jan.06. Paperback in Sept.06, reprint 2011. (Earlier Hindi version published by Granthsilpi, Delhi, in 1998. Urdu version published by NCPUL, New Delhi in 2009). Bengali translation titled British Bharter Vijnan, Sujan Pub., Kolkata, 2007.

Technology and the Raj, jointly edited with Professor Roy MacLeod of Sydney University, SAGE, New Delhi, 1995. Enlarged Hindi version was published by Granthshilpi, Delhi in 2002.

Edited with Vinita Damodaran and Rohan D’Souza, eds. The British Empire and the Natural World: Environmental Encounters in South Asia, OUP, Delhi, 2010.

"Reason, Science and Religion: Gleanings from the Colonial Past", Studies in People’s History, vol.1, issue 2, December  2014, pp. 181–198.

"Science Administration: A Historical Outline", Social Scientist, vol. 43, nos. 1-2, January 2015, pp. 31–42.

"HISTEM and the Making of Modern India – Some Questions and Explanations", Indian Journal of History of Science, vol.50, 4, 2015, pp. 616–628.

Teaching Experience
Lecturer, Department of History, Kurukshetra University, 1976-1983.
Scientist, History and Philosophy of Science Division, NISTADS, 1983-1997.
Associate Professor, Zakir Husain Centre for Educational Studies, JNU, 1998-1999
Professor, Zakir Husain Centre for Educational Studies, JNU, 2000-2017.
Currently Hon. Professor, Maulana Azad National Urdu University, HyderabadAdministrative Experience'''
Head, History and Philosophy of Science Division, NISTADS, (CSIR), 1986-1996.
Chairman, Z.H.Centre for Educational Studies, JNU, 2002-2004, again 2010 - 2011.
Chairman, Campus Development Committee, JNU, 2005-2007.
Senior Warden, Sabarmati Hostel, JNU, 1999-2005.
Director, Educational Records Research Unit, JNU, 2004 - 2010
Founder Chairman, Media Research Centre, SSS, JNU, June 2010 – 2014

Honours and Awards:
First Mahamana Madan Mohan Malaviya Chair, BHU, Banaras, May–July, 2015.
President and Convenor, 20th International Association of Historians of Asia Conference, held at JNU, New Delhi, on 14–17 November 2008.
Founder President, International Commission on Science & Empire, IUHPS/DHS, 1997-2001.
President of the Modern India Section, Indian History Congress, 60th Session, Calicut, December 1999.
Professor R.C.Gupta Endowment History of Science Lecture Award given by the National Academy of Science, Allahabad, July 2001.
President, South Asia Section, Indian Association of Asian and Pacific Studies, Second Biennial Conference, Sambalpur University, 29–31 January 2004.
Vice-President, International Association of Historians of Asia, 2004–06, elected at the 18th IAHA Conf. held at Taipei in 2004.
Member, Academie Internationale D’Histoire des Sciences, Paris.
Chair and Convenor, Science and Society Section, Indian Science Congress, 1993-95.

Lectures/Seminars/Talks Given abroad :
The universities of Oxford, Cambridge, London, Glasgow, Manchester, Sheffield, Lancaster, Bath, Berlin, Sussex, Paris, Amsterdam, Leiden, Tokyo, Kyoto, York, Oslo, Vilnius, Simon Fraser, British Columbia, York, Heidelberg, Hannover, Canberra, Jerusalem, Denver, Wisconsin, Pittsburgh, CUNY, New York, Clemson, South Carolina, Beijing, Tehran, Shiraz, Isfahan, Istanbul, Lisbon, Seoul, NUS Singapore, Academia Sinica,Taipei, Chulalongkorn, Bangkok, The Smithsonian Institution, Washington D.C.,  IIAS, Leiden, MIT, Boston,  NIAS, Copenhagen, and School at Harrow, London.

Fellowships:  Have held visiting fellowships/professorships at the universities of Cambridge, Leiden, London, Wisconsin, Jerusalem, Santiniketan, York, Canberra, Sussex, Tehran, Burdwan, Jadavpur, Hyderabad, Denver, British Columbia, Vilnius, Banaras, Max Planck, Berlin, and The Smithsonian Institution, Washington D.C..

Prof. Deepak Kumar's Jawaharlal Nehru University (JNU) Faculty Page

Indian male writers
20th-century Indian historians
Historians of science
Living people
1952 births